Aquilegia saximontana, the Rocky Mountain columbine, alpine dwarf columbine, dwarf blue columbine, or alpine columbine, is a perennial plant that comes from the buttercup family, Ranunculaceae.

Description
This species of columbine blooms in July and August. The blooms are lavender and white, and the entire plant reaches  in height. This plant is endemic (native only) to the Rocky Mountains in Colorado, United States.

A. saximontana should not be confused with Aquilegia coerulea var. coerulea, which overlaps in range and may also have blue and white flowers.

State flower
There is some confusion as to which species of columbine is the official state flower of Colorado.  The original documents referred to the state flower as being lavender and white in color and not of a particular species.  Today, Aquilegia coerulea is considered the official state flower.  Historically, however, A. saximontana may have a claim to be the "original" state flower of Colorado.

The following has been excerpted from The State of Colorado:

See also
Ecology of the Rocky Mountains

References

saximontana
Flora of the Rocky Mountains
Flora of Colorado
Symbols of Colorado